Coal is used as an energy source in Finland. 
Since Finland has no domestic coal production, it must import all of it from other countries, primarily from Russia. 
Finland is a peat-producing nation. Peat is classified as coal by the IEA. In 2016, the Finnish government announced plans to phase out coal by 2030.

Coal
There is no coal mining or coal tar in Finland, and all coal is imported. 
According to Finnwatch (27.9.2010) there are 13 coal power plants in Finland. The companies Pohjolan Voima, Fortum, Helsingin Energia and Rautaruukki are the largest coal consumers. 
According to the Finnwatch inquiry in 2010 none of the Finnish companies had yet a commitment to coal phase out. 
Energy companies stated following reductions in their future coal use: Helsingin Energia -40% by 2020, Lahti Energia several tens of % by 2012 and Vantaan Energia -30% by 2014. In October 2018, the Finnish parliament approved a government proposal to ban the use of coal to produce energy from May 1, 2029. According to Statistics Finland, the consumption of hard coal decreased by three percent in 2018 in comparison 2017. The consumption of hard coal as a fuel in the generation of electricity and heat amounted to 3.1 million tonnes, corresponding to 79 petajoules (PJ) in energy content.

Peat 

Finland is a producer of peat, which by the definition of IEA is considered as a form of coal.
Peat is environmentally controversial and disputed domestic soil material. 
Peat balances the water levels and prevents floods. 
Peatland plants captures the carbon dioxide in the atmosphere and hence, it is said that the peatland ecosystem is an efficient carbon sink. Undisturbed peat soil areas are rich in flora and fauna.

Vapo Oy is the largest peat producer. 
In 1994 Vapo had 80% of markets in Finland. 
Vapo was state owned company until 2002. Metsäliitto bought one third in 2002 and 49,9% in 2004. The acquisition was studied by the Finnish competition authorities in 2001 based on dominant position in the peat business. The European Commission accepted the deal. In 2009 Metsäliitto sold its share with 165 million € to Etelä-Pohjanmaan Voima Oy (EPV Oy). In practice, Vapo is owned by the state, EPV and the major plants using peat, in the way that EPV has the A series stocks.

Peat energy of Vapo is danger to the sustainability of bogs in Finland.

Coal import
Finland imported 18.3 million tons of coal in 2007–2009. The share of coal by country of origin in 2007-2009 was: Russia 72.5%,  the United States 7.3%,  Canada 6.6%,  Australia 5.9%,  Poland 3.0%,  South Africa 1.4%,  Columbia 1.3%, and  Indonesia 1.1%. 
The majority of Finnish coal is mined in the Kuznetsk Basin of the Kemerovo Oblast, Russia.

Carbon dioxide emissions

See also

Energy in Finland
Energy policy of Finland
Electricity sector in Finland
Electricity generation

References

 
Climate change in Finland